The African Cup of Champions Clubs 1968 was the 4th edition of the annual international club football competition held in the CAF region (Africa), the African Cup of Champions Clubs. It determined that year's club champion of association football in Africa.

The tournament was played by 20 teams and used a knock-out format with ties played home and away. TP Englebert from Congo-Kinshasa won the final, and became CAF club champion for the second time in a row for the first time this makes the record holders for the number of titles won.

Preliminary round

|}
1 Mighty Blackpool, Augustinians FC and Cosmopolitans FC all withdrew.

First round

|}
1 Africa Sports were ejected from the competition for fielding three ineligible players. 
2 Mighty Barolle were disqualified after Liberia was suspended by FIFA. 
3 Stationery Stores won after drawing of lots.

Quarter-finals

|}

1 The 1st leg was abandoned at 72' with Étoile Filante leading 3–0 after Conakry II walked off to protest the officiating and withdrew from the tournament; the 2nd leg was scratched and Étoile Filante advanced. 
2 A third match was played in Dakar by mutual agreement: after this match finished 2–2 when extra time expired, FAR Rabat won after a drawing of lots.

Semi-finals

|}

Final

TP Englebert won 6–4 on aggregate.

Champion

Top scorers
The top scorers from the 1968 African Cup of Champions Clubs are as follows:

External links
RSSSF summary of results at Rec.Sport.Soccer Statistics Foundation

1968 in African football
African Cup of Champions Clubs